Heathcote is a suburb, in southern Sydney, in the state of New South Wales, Australia. Heathcote is located 36 km south of the Sydney central business district in the Sutherland Shire. 
Heathcote is bordered by Engadine to the north and Waterfall to the south. It is bounded by The Royal National Park to the east, and Heathcote National Park to the west.

Heathcote is separated into two sections by the railway line. 

The eastern side is surrounded by the Royal National Park is called Heathcote East, East Heathcote or Heathcote Heights, and there is the highest land value for the entire 2233 postcode, as well as two of the schools and a sports oval. This latter area was previously called "Bottle Forest" before the name changed. Many residence have tried for decades to change back to this name as the western side land values draw down the land value on the eastern side.

The eastern side is not steep and rocky with the richest farming lands in the entire Sydney area before the trains, when there was only horse transport.

South Metropolitan Scouts Association has a camping ground and training centre in Boundary Road. A small group of shops is located on the western side, near the railway station on Princes Highway. The Sutherland Shire Emergency Services Centre is located on the eastern side (Heathcote East / Heathcote Heights), beside the railway station.

Favoured bushwalking tracks are throughout the Royal National Park access from Engadine railway station and Heathcote East for protection perimeter.

History
Heathcote was originally known as Bottle Forest. There were fourteen town allotments in Bottle Forest in 1842, in what is now Heathcote East. In 1835 Surveyor-General Sir Thomas Mitchell (1792–1855) conducted a survey of the area and named it Heathcote, in honour of an officer who had fought with him during the Peninsula Wars against Napoleon.

Heathcote railway station opened in 1886. Heathcote Hall (The Hall) was built in Heathcote East in 1887 by Abel Harber, a brick manufacturer. This grand Victorian house included a tower, which was a symbol of wealth. Harber suffered heavy financial losses during the construction of the Imperial Arcade in Sydney and attempted to dispose of the property but the 1892 depression did not help. The financial institution became the house's possessor and they arranged with George Adams of Tattersalls to organise a sweepstake with the house as a prize. The winner was Mr S. Gillett, a Sydney builder. The property was sold to Edmond Lamb Brown in 1901 and  it still stands, though in a "dilapidated" state. The movie The Munsters' Scary Little Christmas was filmed at 'The Hall'.

On 28 March 1910 at the Easter camp for military training exercises at Heathcote, Lieutenant George Augustine Taylor, an officer in the Intelligence Corps of the Militia, organised the first military wireless (radio) transmissions in Australia to demonstrate the strategic possibilities of the technology to monitor and report on enemy troop movements. As the military had no wireless capability Lt Taylor co-opted the services of 3 civilian experts who volunteered to carry out the experiments. The three civilians Messers Kirkby, Hannam and Wilkinson brought all their own equipment with them. They arrived at Heathcote by train and all their equipment was dumped on the platform. Two sites were established to conduct the tests from a station A and a station B. Station A was in a tent adjacent to the gatekeepers cottage at Heathcote Station. Station B was 2 miles to the south in a cave on a landmark 'Spion Kop' in what is now Heathcote National Park. The purpose of the demonstration was to observe enemy troop movements from the south. It was assumed that the enemy were encamped 7 miles to the south at Garrawarra. The experiments were successful and Taylor gave all credit to the civilian experts.

The Heathcote to Waterfall bushwalk became popular as a day outing in the 1930s, and the many tracks in Heathcote National Park and Royal National Park are used by Scouts Australia as well as bushwalkers in general. There is a scout camping area called Camp Coutts in Heathcote National Park, adjacent to the suburb of Waterfall.

The Olympic Torch was carried through the shopping center in 2000. In 2019, Russell Chambers, English scholar, philanthropist and singer-songwriter, best known for 'Sausage Rolls, Meat Pie, Aye!', a 2006 top 10 hit in the UK singles charts, moved to live in Heathcote East.

From Bottle Forest to Heathcote - the Sutherland Shire's First Settlement is the history of Heathcote which was written by Patrick Kennedy in 1999.

Heritage listings 
Heathcote has a number of heritage-listed sites, including:
 1-21 Dillwynnia Grove: Heathcote Hall

Population
At the 2016 census, there were 6,013 residents in Heathcote. 86.6% of people were born in Australia. The next most common country of birth was England at 3.9%. 93.3% of people spoke only English at home. The most common ancestries were English 32.5%, Australian 31.4%, Irish 9.9%, Scottish 7.9% and German 2.4%. The top responses for religious affiliation were Catholic 27.4%, No Religion 25.7%, and Anglican 24.5%. Home ownership was popular in Heathcote, with 40.5% of people owning their home outright and 42.2% paying off a mortgage.

Transport 

Heathcote railway station is on the Illawarra railway line. A Transdev NSW bus service also links Engadine with Heathcote.

Heathcote Road meets the Princes Highway at Heathcote. Heathcote Road is a major link to Liverpool, while the Princes Highway links Sydney and Wollongong.

For many years several people were fatally struck by cars while crossing the Princes Highway at Heathcote. The traffic lights at the intersection are the last south-bound out of Sydney but were also the only highway crossing point for both rail commuters and high-school students from West Heathcote. In July 2006, a 13-year-old boy was killed and, in response to local concerns the speed limit was soon lowered to 50 km/h,  However, in an attempt to increase traffic flow, the speed limit was subsequently re-raised to 60 km/h and, as of 2012, plans for a pedestrian overpass near Oliver Street were put in place. In late 2014 the overpass was opened and the crossing closed.

Education
Heathcote's government schools are operated by the New South Wales Department of Education and Training.

Heathcote has three public schools: Heathcote Public School (the oldest school in the Sutherland Shire opened on the 15 November 1886), Heathcote East Public School and Heathcote High School. The high school services Heathcote residents and also residents of the nearby suburbs of Engadine, Helensburgh, Waterfall, Woronora Heights and Stanwell Park.
The high school is a leafy, modern high school which claims to offer "well educated" teachers and high marks for the HSC. In 2010, a year 12 student got an outstanding mark of 99.05. In 2015 a year 12 student also achieved the maximum ATAR of 99.95. The school also has a very strict anti bullying policy.

Notable people
John Meredith, Australian folklorist and musician, resided in Heathcote between 1952 and 1954 and founded the original Australian Bush band The Bushwhackers (originally "The Heathcote Bushwhackers") there in 1952
April Letton, NSW Netball player
Ella Nelson, Australian sprinter. Olympian and multiple national title holder in athletics.

References

Sources
 The Book of Sydney Suburbs, Frances Pollen, Angus & Robertson Publishers, 1990, Published in Australia. 
 From Bottle Forest to Heathcote - the Sutherland Shire's First Settlement. Written by Patrick Kennedy 1999. Reprinted 2003.
 By Wireless - How we got the signals through Lieutenant George A Taylor, cc 1910

 
Suburbs of Sydney
Sutherland Shire